Credit valuation adjustments (CVAs) are accounting adjustments made to reserve a portion of profits on uncollateralized financial derivatives. They are charged by a bank to a risky (capable of default) counterparty to compensate the bank for taking on the credit risk of the counterparty during the life of the transaction. These most common transaction types are interest rate derivatives, foreign exchange derivatives, and combinations thereof. The reserved profits can be viewed mathematically as the net present value of the credit risk embedded in the transaction. 

In financial mathematics one defines CVA as the difference between the risk-free portfolio value and the true portfolio value that takes into account the possibility of a counterparty's default. In other words, CVA is the market value of counterparty credit risk. This price depends on counterparty credit spreads as well as on the market risk factors that drive derivatives' values and, therefore, exposure. CVA is one of a family of related valuation adjustments, collectively xVA;  for further context here see .

Unilateral CVA is given by the risk-neutral expectation of the discounted loss. The risk-neutral expectation can be written as

 

These probabilities can be obtained from the term structure of credit default swap (CDS) spreads.

More generally CVA can refer to a few different concepts:
 The mathematical concept as defined above;
 A part of the regulatory Capital and RWA (risk-weighted asset) calculation introduced under Basel 3;
 The CVA desk of an investment bank, whose purpose is to:
 hedge for possible losses due to counterparty default;
 hedge to reduce the amount of capital required under the CVA calculation of Basel 3;
 The "CVA charge". The hedging of the CVA desk has a cost associated to it, i.e. the bank has to buy the hedging instrument. This cost is then allocated to each business line of an investment bank (usually as a contra revenue). This allocated cost is called the "CVA Charge".

According to the Basel Committee on Banking Supervision's July 2015 consultation document regarding CVA calculations, if CVA is calculated using 100 timesteps with 10,000 scenarios per timestep, 1 million simulations are required to compute the value of CVA. Calculating CVA risk would require 250 daily market risk scenarios over the 12-month stress period. CVA has to be calculated for each market risk scenario, resulting in 250 million simulations. These calculations have to be repeated across 6 risk types and 5 liquidity horizons, resulting in potentially 8.75 billion simulations.

Exposure, independent of counterparty default

Assuming independence between exposure and counterparty's credit quality greatly simplifies the analysis. Under this assumption this simplifies to

 

where  is the risk-neutral discounted expected exposure (EE):

Approximation 
Full calculation of CVA is done via Monte-Carlo simulation of all risk factors which is very computationally demanding. There exists a simple approximation for CVA which consists in buying just one default protection (Credit Default Swap) for amount of NPV of netted set of derivatives for each counterparty.

Function of the CVA desk and implications for technology
In the view of leading investment banks, CVA is essentially an activity carried out by both finance and a trading desk in the Front Office.  Tier 1 banks either already generate counterparty EPE and ENE (expected positive/negative exposure) under the ownership of the CVA desk (although this often has another name) or plan to do so.  Whilst a CVA platform is based on an exposure measurement platform, the requirements of an active CVA desk differ from those of a Risk Control group and it is not uncommon to see institutions use different systems for risk exposure management on one hand and CVA pricing and hedging on the other.

A good introduction can be found in a paper by Michael Pykhtin and Steven Zhu.
Karlsson et al. (2016) present a numerical efficient method for calculating expected exposure, potential future exposure and CVA for interest rate derivatives, in particular Bermudan swaptions.

See also 
 Financial derivative
 Potential future exposure
 XVA

References

External links
 Credit Valuation Adjustment (CVA) - Corporate Finance Institute

Actuarial science
Mathematical finance
Credit risk
Monte Carlo methods in finance